The 1983–84 North American Soccer League indoor season was the fourth and last in league history. The San Diego Sockers defeated the New York Cosmos for their third straight indoor title, having won the NASL Indoor title in 1981–82 and the MISL title in 1982–83.

Season recap
The NASL was struggling for life at this point, and finding teams to play the indoor season would be difficult. While San Diego, the Chicago Sting and the Golden Bay Earthquakes were committed to the league, filling out the ranks would be problematic. With the league making plain their desire to have both an indoor and outdoor element going forward, the Fort Lauderdale Strikers decided to move to Minnesota for the 1984 NASL season due to a lack of suitable arenas in the local area.

The Tampa Bay Rowdies were unsure whether or not they would be able to play, as the previous owners had committed to play in the indoor season and then sold the team. This left the new owners in the lurch. The lack of a suitable arena was also an issue, eventually forcing Rowdies' home games to be split among three sites. The Tulsa Roughnecks were only in the league thanks to a fundraiser that put $65,000 in the team's coffers, even though the team had won the outdoor Soccer Bowl just weeks earlier.

Despite the uncertainty, this would be the largest NASL Indoor season ever as a 32-game regular season, a best-of-three semifinal round and a best-of-five championship series were on the schedule. Also, the first (and only) All-Star Game in NASL history took place on February 8 at Chicago Stadium. The hometown Chicago Sting took on an All-Star team of the six other squads. Despite four goals from Chicago's Karl-Heinz Granitza, the All-Stars won 9–8.

Not surprisingly, the teams with steady management performed best through the season. The Sockers averaged over 11,000 for their home games and finished first, overcoming a slow 8-8 start. The hot streak continued in the playoffs as the team won all five of their postseason games en route to the NASL title.

The NASL confirmed plans for 40-game indoor seasons in 1985 and 1986 near the end of the season, but folded for good in March 1985. By then, San Diego, Minnesota, New York and Chicago had joined the MISL. While the Sockers, Strikers and Sting experienced success in the MISL, the Cosmos would start the season but drop out on February 22, 1985.

Teams

Regular season
The 1983–84 regular season schedule ran from November 11, 1983, to March 25, 1984. The 32 games per team was almost double the length of previous NASL Indoor seasons.

W = Wins, L = Losses, GB = Games Behind 1st Place, Pct. = Winning Percentage, GF = Goals For, GA = Goals Against

Regular season statistics

Scoring leaders

GP = Games Played, G = Goals, A = Assists, Pts = Points

Leading goalkeepers

Note: GP = Games played; Min – Minutes played; GA = Goals against; GAA = Goals against average; W = Wins; L = Losses

1984 NASL All-Star Game
On February 8, the city of Chicago hosted what turned out to be the only All-Star game in NASL history. The Chicago Sting battled a team of All-Stars from the other six teams for the benefit of Chicago Tribune Charities. The starters were voted on by the players, while San Diego coach Ron Newman selected the reserves. The All-Stars outdueled the Sting 9–8 before 14,328 fans at Chicago Stadium, despite an MVP performance by Chicago's Karl-Heinz Granitza. Granitza scored four goals on the night.

*Alan Mayer of San Diego was originally selected as a starter but due to a broken finger was unable to play. Tino Lettieri of Vancouver was named as his replacement.^Stan Terlecki of New York was originally selected as a reserve but due to injury was unable to play. Zequinha of Tulsa was named as his replacement.

Match report

NASL All-Stars
During the finals the NASL announced the traditional All-NASL team of All-Stars, as voted on by the players at the end of the regular season.

Playoffs

Bracket

Semifinals
Best of three series

Championship Series
Best of five series

Championship match reports

1983–84 NASL Indoor Champions: San Diego Sockers

Post-season awards
Most Valuable Player: Steve Zungul, Golden Bay
Coach of the Year: Eddie Firmani, New York
Finals MVP: Jean Willrich, San Diego

Team attendance totals

References

External links
 The Year in American Soccer – 1984

NASL Indoor seasons
NASL
NASL